Frischmann is a surname of German origin, being a variant of the surnames Frisch and Frischman. Notable people with the surname include:

David Frischmann (1859-1922), Hebrew and Yiddish modernist writer, poet, and translator
Jörg Frischmann (born 1963), German Paralympic athlete
Justine Frischmann (born 1969), English artist and retired musician
Wilem Frischmann (born 1931), British engineer

See also
Pell Frischmann, a multi-disciplinary engineering consultancy based in London
Frisch